English afternoon tea or simply afternoon tea is a traditional blend of teas originating from India, China, Africa and Sri Lanka. Afternoon tea blends are often lighter than breakfast blends, being designed to "complement, rather than mask the flavor of the afternoon tea meal".

See also 
 English breakfast tea
 Irish breakfast tea
 Tea (meal)

References

Further reading

Blended tea
English drinks
Tea in the United Kingdom